Pirates and Plunder is a role-playing game published by Yaquinto Publications in 1982.

Description
Pirates and Plunder is a historical system set in the age of piracy in the Caribbean; the rules are aimed at beginning role-players. The first book (44 pages) covers character creation and combat; the second (52 pages) covers advanced rules for use by the GM in running the game; the third (40 pages) contains an introductory scenario, encounters, and a map. The game includes a pad of character record sheets.

Publication history
Pirates and Plunder was designed by Michael S. Matheny, and was published by Yaquinto Publications as a boxed set including a 52-page book, a 44-page book, and a 40-page book, a pad, reference sheets, and dice.

Reception
W.G. Armintrout reviewed Pirates & Plunder in The Space Gamer No. 56. Armintrout commented that "I supposed [its high seas adventuring] makes it a game players will enjoy, if they can convince some soul to GM it for them."

Murray Writtle reviewed Pirates and Plunder for White Dwarf #36, giving it an overall rating of 10 out of 10, and stated that "This is a good game, because it is full of atmosphere and the rules can be as simple or complex as you want."

Lawrence Schick describes the Pirates and Plunder game system as "Second-rate".

John ONeill of Black Gate commented: "Pirates and Plunder had a few things going for it. For one thing, the designer chose his genre well. While many titles in that new flood of RPGs were greeted with skepticism, or sometimes open laughter [...] most gamers saw the potential of a pirate RPG immediately." He believed the game failed there "was no hint of anything like the supernatural in the rules" which "just wasn't enough for players raised on Dungeons and Dragons. While the designers may have seen it as a noble effort to capture the pure swashbuckling fun of classic pirate novels and movies like Captain Blood, what we saw instead was a lack of imagination. There just wasn't enough to keep our attention."

Reviews
 Different Worlds #32 (Jan./Feb., 1984)

References

Historical role-playing games
Historical Swashbuckler role-playing games
Role-playing games introduced in 1981
Yaquinto Publications games